PMDA may refer to:

 Pharmaceuticals and Medical Devices Agency, a Japanese governmental organization, similar in function to the Food and Drug Administration (FDA) in the US
 Plutonium Management and Disposition Agreement, an agreement between the United States and Russia signed in 2000
 Pyromellitic dianhydride, an organic compound (an Isobenzofuran)